Clione is a genus of small, floating sea slugs, pelagic marine gastropod mollusks in the family Clionidae, the sea angels.

Clione is the type genus of the family Clionidae.

Species 
Species within the genus Clione include:
Clione antarctica (Smith, 1902)
Clione elegantissima  (Dall, 1871)
Clione limacina (Phipps, 1774)
Clione okhotensis Yamazaki & Kuwahara, 2017

References 

 Vaught, K.C. (1989). A classification of the living Mollusca. American Malacologists: Melbourne, FL (USA). . XII, 195 pp. 
 Gofas, S.; Le Renard, J.; Bouchet, P. (2001). Mollusca, in: Costello, M.J. et al. (Ed.) (2001). European register of marine species: a check-list of the marine species in Europe and a bibliography of guides to their identification. Collection Patrimoines Naturels, 50: pp. 180–213

Further reading 
 Gilmer R. W. & Lalli C. M. (1990). "Bipolar variation in Clione, a gymnosomatous pteropod". Am. Malacol. Union Bull. 8(1): 67-75.

Clionidae

ja:クリオネ